Mickey Maguire (born c. 1926) is a former Grey Cup champion Canadian Football League player.

Maguire was versatile, playing both sides of the football (as many players did during that time). He first played in the CFL with his hometown Montreal Alouettes, playing 3 games during their Grey Cup championship 1949 season.  After a year with the Calgary Stampeders he played in the 1951 Grey Cup with the Saskatchewan Roughriders, where his fumble cost the team a touchdown in their defeat. He ended his career in 1952 with the Winnipeg Blue Bombers.

References

Canadian people of Irish descent
Montreal Alouettes players
Calgary Stampeders players
Saskatchewan Roughriders players
Winnipeg Blue Bombers players
Players of Canadian football from Quebec
Anglophone Quebec people
1920s births
Possibly living people